Mizrachi or Mizrahi has two meanings. 

In the literal Hebrew meaning Eastern, it  may refer to:
Mizrahi Jews, Jews from the Middle East
 Mizrahi (surname), a Sephardic surname, given to Jews who got to the Iberian Peninsula from the east or Jews who lived in the eastern side of the peninsula.
Mizrahi Hebrew, a blanket term for dialects of Mizrahi Jews
Mizrahi music, an Israeli musical genre
מִזְרָחִי may also be a notarikon (Hebrew abbreviation) of מרכז רוחני, merkaz ruhani – "spiritual centre", introduced by rabbi Samuel Mohilever. In his meaning it may refer to:
Mizrachi (religious Zionism), a religious Zionist movement
Mizrachi (political party) and Hapoel HaMizrachi, defunct Israeli political parties
Mizrahi Democratic Rainbow Coalition
, Latvia
Bank Mizrahi, a precursor of Bank Mizrahi-Tefahot, Israel

Language and nationality disambiguation pages